A bowler is someone participating in the sport of bowling, either as an amateur or professional.  In American ten-pin bowling, a bowler is most commonly a member of a team of three to six people.  Most bowling leagues limit the number of team members to five, with alternates available as needed.

There are a number of bowling tournaments held around the world, both large-scale international events and small local competitions.  Professional bowlers in the USA are members of the Professional Bowlers Association (PBA).

Famous bowlers

Jason Belmonte
Earl Anthony
Parker Bohn III
Norm Duke
Bryan Goebel
Marshall Holman
Mika Koivuniemi
Johnny Petraglia
Mark Roth
Dick Weber
Pete Weber
Walter Ray Williams Jr.
EJ Tackett
Premethias Pokenhana
Rafael Nepomuceno

References

Ten-pin bowling